Rhododendron ciliatum (睫毛杜鹃) is a rhododendron species native to eastern Nepal, Sikkim, Bhutan, southern Tibet, and Xizang in China, where it grows at altitudes of . Flowers are white tinged with pink.

References
 "Rhododendron ciliatum", J. D. Hooker, Rhododendr. Sikkim-Himalaya. 3: t. 24. 1851.

ciliatum